Namdrik Atoll or Namorik Atoll (Marshallese:) is a coral atoll of two islands in the Pacific Ocean, and forms a legislative district of the Ralik Chain of the Marshall Islands.

The atoll consists of two large wooded islets. The larger (also called Namorik) wraps around the central lagoon from the southwest to the northeast, while the smaller island closes off the northwest corner of the lagoon. A coral islet stands between them on the reef, with numerous black boulders. The very shallow lagoon is cut off from the sea by the drying coral reef. Boats can cross the reef with difficulty, at high water on the west side of the atoll.

Landing near the west side of Namorik Islet can be effected about 90 m south of it. There is no shelter during northeast winds, and it is dangerous with strong southwest winds when there is a heavy sea. There is a fringing reef which extends about 135 m in the vicinity of the landing place. There is a depth of about 1.2 m and there are rocks in places. Two stranded wrecks lie about 90 m off the south shore along the reef line. (Sailing Directions Pub-153)

History
Namdrik Atoll was claimed by the Empire of Germany along with the rest of the Marshall Islands in 1884. After World War I, the island came under the South Seas Mandate of the Empire of Japan. Following the end of World War II, it came under the control of the United States as part of the Trust Territory of the Pacific Islands until the independence of the Marshall Islands in 1986.

Namdrik Atoll has a population of approximately 500. It is the smallest inhabited atoll in the Marshall Islands and consists of just two islands, Namdrik and Matemat. There are three churches, and one elementary school with approximately 200 students. The school employs about 9 teachers (K-8) and usually has a World Teach volunteer teacher to teach English as a Second Language. The atoll has an airstrip that receives an Air Marshall Islands flight once or twice a fortnight. Namdrik Atoll recently invested in pearl farming in the lagoon, and has received a grant from AusAid to buy machinery that turns copra into coconut oil. There is one truck on Namdrik that transports coconuts from around the island to the dock. There was no fighting on Namdrik Atoll during World War II.

Most buildings on Namdrik are powered by solar power, though there are a few generators on-island. A supply boat stops at Namdrik every month or two, with the large 'Field Trip Ships' usually stopping three times in a year. Ships cannot enter Namdrik's lagoon without banking on a reef, so unloading ships need to wait 'ocean side' for small Namdrik boats to travel between ship and shore to load and unload all of the goods.

Namdrik Atoll made international headlines in November 2011 when two fishermen from Kiribati turned up alive on the island after drifting for thirty-three days at sea.

The mayor of Namdrik Atoll is Mr. Clarence Luther. The recently deceased senator for Namdrik Atoll was Mattlan Zackhras.

Education
Marshall Islands Public School System operates Namdrik Elementary School. Students are zoned to Jaluit High School in Jaluit Atoll.

References

External links

EVS-Islands: Namorik Atoll MH

Marshall Islands site
Namdrik Info Page
Official Namdrik Facebook Page
Seacology's Page on Namdrik Pearls
Pearl-Guide's Page on Namdrik Pearls

IUCN Category VI
Atolls of the Marshall Islands
Ralik Chain
Municipalities of the Marshall Islands
Ramsar sites in the Marshall Islands